The RIBA International Award is the Royal Institute of British Architects' highest award.

The shortlist for the Lubetkin Prize is made up of the winners of the RIBA International Awards.

Laureates

2011
RIBA International award winners in 2011 were:

2010
RIBA International award winners in 2010 were:

2009
RIBA International award winners in 2009 were:

2008
RIBA International award winners in 2008 were:

2007
RIBA International award winners in 2007 were:

See also
 List of architecture prizes

References

Architecture awards
Royal Institute of British Architects
Awards established in 2007